The Coupe de la Jeunesse is an international rowing regatta rowed over 2,000 m every year. It was founded in 1985 and is open to rowers who are 18 or under by the end of the current calendar year. It is a two-day team event, with points awarded to nations based on finishing position in each category. As a result, a strong overall team is required to take overall victory in the Coupe, and the event has only ever been won by Great Britain (15 wins), Italy (13 wins), and France (8 wins). 

Each category is raced separately on the first and second day of the regatta, allowing different Coupe de la Jeunesse event winners on each day. Many countries use this regatta as a destination for athletes who do not reach the standard required for the Junior World Championships.

Categories raced 

Events are raced in the following boats (using standard abbreviations):

 Men: 8+, 4+, 4-, 2-, 4x, 2x, 1x
 Women: 8+, 4-, 2-, 4x, 2x, 1x

Prior to its addition to the official programme in 2007 the women's eights event was raced as a demonstration event for two years, and is still the only event to be raced immediately before the Opening Ceremony. Crews competing in the eights consist of rowers who are also racing in other events at the Coupe de la Jeunesse.

Competing countries 

Austria
Belgium
Czech Republic
Denmark
France
Great Britain
Hungary
Ireland
Italy
Netherlands
Norway
Poland
Portugal
Spain
Sweden
Switzerland

Organisation 

The Coupe has a four-member Executive Committee elected by the Delegate Assembly.

Currently the Executive Committee consists of:

 Gary Harris, President (Great Britain)
 Gwenda Stevens, Secretary General (Belgium)
 Judit Meszaros, Technical Assessor (Hungary)
 Bas Labordus, Technical Assessor (The Netherlands)

Venues and results

References

External links
Official Site

Rowing competitions
Recurring sporting events established in 1985
1985 establishments in Italy